The United States has produced several coins and banknotes of its dollar which no longer circulate or have been disused. Many of these were removed for specific reasons such as inflation reducing their value, a lack of demand, or being too similar to another denomination.

Treasury notes 

Although still legal tender, most are in the hands of collectors and museums. The reverse designs featured abstract scroll-work with ornate denomination identifiers. With the exception of the  bill, these bills ceased production in the 1940s, and were recalled in 1969.
The United States also issued fractional currency for a brief time in the 1860s and 1870s, in several denominations each less than a dollar.

Coinage 

There have been numerous coins throughout the United States dollar's history that no longer circulate. Some, like the half-cent coin were removed due to inflation reducing their value while others such as the two-cent piece were removed due to a lack of demand.

Note that this table shows the latest status before the coin denomination was rendered obsolete.

Notes
 Some Early United States commemorative coins were minted in this denomination.
 Some Modern United States commemorative coins are minted in this denomination.
 The United States government claims that it never officially released the 1933 double eagle. Examples of the coin were minted in that year, but were never released to circulation following Executive Order 6102.

References